The following outline is provided as an overview of and topical guide to computer security:

Computer security is commonly known as security applied to computing devices such as computers and smartphones, as well as computer networks such as private and public networks, including the whole Internet.  The field covers all the processes and mechanisms by which digital equipment, information and services are protected from unintended or unauthorized access, change or destruction, and is of growing importance in line with the increasing reliance on computer systems of most societies worldwide. Computer security includes measures taken to ensure the integrity of files stored on a computer or server as well as measures taken to prevent unauthorized access to stored data, by securing the physical perimeter of the computer equipment, authentication of users or computer accounts accessing the data, and providing a secure method of data transmission.

Essence of computer security 
Computer security can be described as all of the following:

 a branch of security
Network security 
application security

Areas of computer security 
 Access control – selective restriction of access to a place or other resource. The act of accessing may mean consuming, entering, or using. Permission to access a resource is called authorization.
 Computer access control – includes authorization, authentication, access approval, and audit.
Authentication
 Knowledge-based authentication
 Integrated Windows Authentication
 Password
 Password length parameter
 Secure Password Authentication
 Secure Shell
 Kerberos (protocol)
 SPNEGO
 NTLMSSP
 AEGIS SecureConnect
 TACACS
 Cyber security and countermeasure
 Device fingerprint
 Physical security – protecting property and people from damage or harm (such as from theft, espionage, or terrorist attacks). It includes security measures designed to deny unauthorized access to facilities, (such as a computer room), equipment (such as your computer), and resources (like the data storage devices, and data, in your computer). If a computer gets stolen, then the data goes with it. In addition to theft, physical access to a computer allows for ongoing espionage, like the installment of a hardware keylogger device, and so on.
 Data security – protecting data, such as a database, from destructive forces and the unwanted actions of unauthorized users.
 Information privacy – relationship between collection and dissemination of data, technology, the public expectation of privacy, and the legal and political issues surrounding them. Privacy concerns exist wherever personally identifiable information or other sensitive information is collected and stored – in digital form or otherwise. Improper or non-existent disclosure control can be the root cause for privacy issues.
 Internet privacy – involves the right or mandate of personal privacy concerning the storing, repurposing, provision to third parties, and displaying of information pertaining to oneself via the Internet. Privacy can entail either Personally Identifying Information (PII) or non-PII information such as a site visitor's behavior on a website. PII refers to any information that can be used to identify an individual. For example, age and physical address alone could identify who an individual is without explicitly disclosing their name, as these two factors relate to a specific person.
 Mobile security – security pertaining to smartphones, especially with respect to the personal and business information stored on them.
 Network security – provisions and policies adopted by a network administrator to prevent and monitor unauthorized access, misuse, modification, or denial of a computer network and network-accessible resources. Network security involves the authorization of access to data in a network, which is controlled by the network administrator.
 Network Security Toolkit
 Internet security – computer security specifically related to the Internet, often involving browser security but also network security on a more general level as it applies to other applications or operating systems on a whole. Its objective is to establish rules and measures to use against attacks over the Internet. The Internet represents an insecure channel for exchanging information leading to a high risk of intrusion or fraud, such as phishing. Different methods have been used to protect the transfer of data, including encryption.
 World Wide Web Security – dealing with the vulnerabilities of users who visit websites. Cybercrime on the Web can include identity theft, fraud, espionage and intelligence gathering. For criminals, the Web has become the preferred way to spread malware.

Computer security threats 

The variety of threats combined with the rapid development of new threats has made cyber insecurity and the removal of information assurance the 'status quo'.  As long as man continues to use the computer, man will also takes interest in manipulating, modifying, creating and bypassing 'rules' and 'security standards.'

The most common and effective method of violating computer security protocols is Phishing; Phishing is the process of providing a cloned login page for a site the victim uses, for example, Google's Gmail - once the user enters his/her login information, the data is captured and access to the victims account is gained.

Many corporations executive's, mid-ranking managers and even low level staff of many current U.S. corporations have no idea that a malicious user is quietly and passively intercepting their communications. Why? A strong motivation is the theft of Intellectual Property. Often victims of phishing either never become aware there privacy has been breached, or many months pass before they become aware that their privacy has been lost.

Methods of Computer Network Attack and Computer Network Exploitation

Social engineering is a frequent method of attack, and can take the form of phishing, or spear phishing in the corporate or government world, as well as counterfeit websites.
 Password sharing and insecure password practices
 Poor patch management
 Computer crime – 
 Computer criminals – 
 Hackers – in the context of computer security, a hacker is someone who seeks and exploits weaknesses in a computer system or computer network.
 Password cracking – 
 Software cracking – 
 Script kiddies – 
 List of computer criminals –
 Identity theft –
 Computer malfunction – 
 Operating system failure and vulnerabilities
 Hard disk drive failure – occurs when a hard disk drive malfunctions and the stored information cannot be accessed with a properly configured computer. A disk failure may occur in the course of normal operation, or due to an external factor such as exposure to fire or water or high magnetic fields, or suffering a sharp impact or environmental contamination, which can lead to a head crash.  Data recovery from a failed hard disk is problematic and expensive. Backups are essential 
 Computer and network surveillance – 
 Man in the Middle
 Loss of anonymity – when one's identity becomes known. Identification of people or their computers allows their activity to be tracked.  For example, when a person's name is matched with the IP address they are using, their activity can be tracked thereafter by monitoring the IP address.
 HTTP Cookie
 Local Shared Object
 Web bug
 Spyware
Adware
 Cyber spying – obtaining secrets without the permission of the holder of the information (personal, sensitive, proprietary or of classified nature), from individuals, competitors, rivals, groups, governments and enemies for personal, economic, political or military advantage using methods on the Internet, networks or individual computers through the use of cracking techniques and malicious software including Trojan horses and spyware. It may be done online from by professionals sitting at their computer desks on bases in far away countries, or it may involve infiltration at home by computer trained conventional spies and moles, or it may be the criminal handiwork of amateur malicious hackers, software programmers, or thieves.
 Computer and network eavesdropping
 Lawful Interception
 War Driving
 Packet analyzer (aka packet sniffer) – mainly used as a security tool (in many ways, including for the detection of network intrusion attempts), packet analyzers can also be used for spying, to collect sensitive information (e.g., login details, cookies, personal communications) sent through a network, or to reverse engineer proprietary protocols used over a network. One way to protect data sent over a network such as the Internet is by using encryption software.
 Cyberwarfare – 
 Exploit – piece of software, a chunk of data, or a sequence of commands that takes advantage of a bug, glitch or vulnerability in order to cause unintended or unanticipated behavior to occur on computer software, hardware, or something electronic (usually computerized). Such behavior frequently includes things like gaining control of a computer system, allowing privilege escalation, or a denial-of-service attack.
 Trojan
 Computer virus
 Computer worm
 Denial-of-service attack – an attempt to make a machine or network resource unavailable to its intended users, usually consisting of efforts to temporarily or indefinitely interrupt or suspend services of a host connected to the Internet.  One common method of attack involves saturating the target machine with external communications requests, so much so that it cannot respond to legitimate traffic, or responds so slowly as to be rendered essentially unavailable.
 Distributed denial-of-service attack (DDoS) – DoS attack sent by two or more persons.
 Hacking tool
 Malware
 Computer virus
 Computer worm
 Keylogger – program that does keystroke logging, which is the action of recording (or logging) the keys struck on a keyboard, typically in a covert manner so that the person using the keyboard is unaware that their actions are being monitored. There are also HID spoofing hardware keyloggers, like a USB device inserting stored keystores when connected.
 Rootkit – stealthy type of software, typically malicious, designed to hide the existence of certain processes or programs from normal methods of detection and enable continued privileged access to a computer. The term rootkit is a concatenation of "root" (the traditional name of the privileged account on Unix operating systems) and the word "kit" (which refers to the software components that implement the tool). 
 Spyware
 Trojan
 Data loss –
 File deletion –
 Data loss prevention software
 Natural disasters – fire, flood, etc. can cause loss of computers and data. Either fire or water can cause a hard disk drive failure, for example. Earthquakes can cause a data center to go down. For this reason large web businesses  use load balancing and failover techniques to ensure business continuity.
 Payload - malicious code that is delivered to a vulnerable computer, often masquerading  as something else
 Physical loss – losing a computer (for example due to fire, or leaving one's laptop on a bus), results in data loss, unless there is a backup.
 Physical theft – when someone takes property without authorization as his or her own.  When a computer is stolen, the data is gone too, unless there is a backup.
 Laptop theft – stealing a laptop computer. Victims of laptop theft can lose hardware, software, and essential data that has not been backed up. Thieves also may have access to sensitive data and personal information. Some systems authorize access based on credentials stored on the laptop including MAC addresses, web cookies, cryptographic keys and stored passwords.
 Vulnerabilities
 Exploitable vulnerability – vulnerability for which an exploit exists
 Open port – TCP or UDP port number that is configured to accept packets. Ports are an integral part of the Internet's communication model — they are the channel through which applications on the client computer can reach the software on the server. Services, such as web pages or FTP, require their respective ports to be "open" on the server in order to be publicly reachable. "Open" (reachable) is not enough for a communication channel to be established. There needs to be an application (service) listening on that port, accepting the incoming packets and processing them. Open ports are vulnerable when there is a service listening and there is no firewall filtering incoming packets to them.
 Security bug
 Zero-day attack
 Hackers

Computer defenses and security measures 

 Access Control Systems
 Authentication
 Multi-factor authentication
 Authorization
Firewalls and Internet Security
Firewall
 Firewall pinhole
 NAT hole punching
 TCP hole punching
 UDP hole punching
 ICMP hole punching
 Next-Generation Firewall
 Virtual firewall
Stateful firewall
Context-based access control
Dual-homed
IPFilter
Zone Alarm
 Linux firewall capabilities
 Debian
 Vyatta
 VyOS
BSD Router Project
 FreeBSD 
 M0n0wall
 Ipfirewall
 OPNsense
 PfSense
 Intrusion detection system
 Intrusion prevention system
 Mobile secure gateway

Access control 
Access control – selective restriction of access to a place or other resource. The act of accessing may mean consuming, entering, or using. Permission to access a resource is called authorization.
 Computer access control – includes authorization, authentication, access approval, and audit.
 Authorization – function of specifying access rights to computer resources. "To authorize" is to define an access policy. For example, human resources staff is normally authorized to access employee records and this policy is may be formalized as access control rules in a computer system. During operation, the computer system uses the access control rules to decide whether access requests from (authenticated) consumers shall be approved (granted) or disapproved (rejected). Resources include individual files or an item's data, computer programs, computer devices and functionality provided by computer applications. Examples of consumers are computer users, computer programs and other devices attempting to access data that is on a computer.
 Authentication – act of confirming the identity of a consumer. In this context, a consumer is a computer user, computer program, or other device attempting to access data that is on a computer
 User account – system ID unique to each user. It allows a user to authenticate (log in) to a system and to be granted authorization to access resources provided by or connected to that system; however, authentication does not imply authorization. To log in to an account, a user is typically required to authenticate oneself with a password or other credentials for the purposes of accounting, security, logging, and resource management.
 Password – word or string of characters used for user authentication to prove identity or access approval to gain access to a resource (example: an access code is a type of password), which should be kept secret from those not allowed access.
 Access approval (computer access control) –
 Audit – 
 Physical security – protecting property and people from damage or harm (such as from theft, espionage, or terrorist attacks). It includes security measures designed to deny unauthorized access to facilities, (such as a computer room), equipment (such as your computer), and resources (like the data storage devices, and data, in your computer). If a computer gets stolen, then the data goes with it. In addition to theft, physical access to a computer allows for ongoing espionage, like the installment of a hardware keylogger device, and so on. Examples of physical security system components include:
 Locks – locks may be used to secure a building or room that a computer is in. They may also be used on computer casings to prevent opening computers to remove or swap out parts, or install unauthorized components. And they may be used on a computer to disallow it from being turned on or used without a physical key. There are also locks to attach cables to laptops to prevent them from being taken.
 Computer lock –
 Security alarms –
 Security barriers – such as fences and walls.
 Security guards –
 Theft recovery software – as LoJack is to cars, theft recovery software is to desktop and laptop computers.

Application security 

Application security
 Antivirus software
 Secure coding
 Security by design
 Secure operating systems

Data security 

Data security – protecting data, such as a database, from destructive forces and the unwanted actions of unauthorized users.

Information privacy 
 Information privacy – relationship between collection and dissemination of data, technology, the public expectation of privacy, and the legal and political issues surrounding them. Privacy concerns exist wherever personally identifiable information or other sensitive information is collected and stored – in digital form or otherwise. Improper or non-existent disclosure control can be the root cause for privacy issues.
 Internet privacy – involves the right or mandate of personal privacy concerning the storing, repurposing, provision to third parties, and displaying of information pertaining to oneself via the Internet. Privacy can entail either Personally Identifying Information (PII) or non-PII information such as a site visitor's behavior on a website. PII refers to any information that can be used to identify an individual. For example, age and physical address alone could identify who an individual is without explicitly disclosing their name, as these two factors relate to a specific person.

Mobile security 
 Mobile security – security pertaining to smartphones, especially with respect to the personal and business information stored on them.

Network security 
 Network security – provisions and policies adopted by a network administrator to prevent and monitor unauthorized access, misuse, modification, or denial of a computer network and network-accessible resources. Network security involves the authorization of access to data in a network, which is controlled by the network administrator.
 Internet security – computer security specifically related to the Internet, often involving browser security but also network security on a more general level as it applies to other applications or operating systems on a whole. Its objective is to establish rules and measures to use against attacks over the Internet. The Internet represents an insecure channel for exchanging information leading to a high risk of intrusion or fraud, such as phishing. Different methods have been used to protect the transfer of data, including encryption.
 Virtual private network (VPN) – extends a private network across a public network, such as the Internet. It enables a computer or network-enabled device to send and receive data across shared or public networks as if it were directly connected to the private network, while benefiting from the functionality, security and management policies of the private network. A VPN is created by establishing a virtual point-to-point connection through the use of dedicated connections, virtual tunneling protocols, or traffic encryptions.
 IPsec – protocol suite for securing Internet Protocol (IP) communications by authenticating and encrypting each IP packet of a communication session. IPsec includes protocols for establishing mutual authentication between agents at the beginning of the session and negotiation of cryptographic keys to be used during the session. IPsec can be used in protecting data flows between a pair of hosts (host-to-host), between a pair of security gateways (network-to-network), or between a security gateway and a host (network-to-host).
 OpenVPN – open-source software application that implements virtual private network (VPN) techniques for creating secure point-to-point or site-to-site connections in routed or bridged configurations and remote access facilities. It uses a custom security protocol that utilizes SSL/TLS for key exchange. It is capable of traversing network address translators (NATs) and firewalls. It was written by James Yonan and is published under the GNU General Public License (GPL).

World Wide Web Security 
 World Wide Web Security – dealing with the vulnerabilities of users who visit websites. Cybercrime on the Web can include identity theft, fraud, espionage and intelligence gathering. For criminals, the Web has become the preferred way to spread malware.

History of computer security 

 Timeline of computer security hacker history

Computer security industry

Computer security software 

 Antivirus software
 List of antivirus software (and comparison)
 Encryption software
 List of cryptographic file systems
 Pretty Good Privacy
 Firewall
 List of firewalls (and comparison)
 List of router and firewall distributions

Testing labs 
 AV-TEST – independent organization which evaluates and rates antivirus and security suite software for Microsoft Windows and Android operating systems, according to a variety of criteria.  Every other month, the researchers publish the results of their testing, where they list which products they awarded their certification.  The organisation is based in Magdeburg, in Germany.
 ICSA Labs – independent division of Verizon Business that tests and certifies computer security software (including anti-spyware, anti-virus, and firewall products), for a fee.
 Virus Bulletin – magazine that conducts tests of anti-virus software.  The magazine itself is about the prevention, detection and removal of malware and spam. It regularly features analyses of the latest virus threats, articles exploring new developments in the fight against viruses, interviews with anti-virus experts, and evaluations of current anti-malware products.
 West Coast Labs – tests computer security products for a fee. Its Checkmark Certification program reports test results to the public.

Computer security companies 

 McAfee, Inc. (Intel Security) – American global computer security software company headquartered in Santa Clara, California, and the world's largest dedicated security technology company. On February 28, 2011, McAfee became a wholly owned subsidiary of Intel. In early 2014, Intel announced it would rebrand McAfee as Intel Security in 2014.
 Secunia – American computer security company with software offerings in vulnerability management, PC security and patch management.

Computer security publications

Journals and magazines 
 2600: The Hacker Quarterly – technical and political articles of interest to the internet security community
 Virus Bulletin – magazine about the prevention, detection and removal of malware and spam. It regularly features analyses of the latest virus threats, articles exploring new developments in the fight against viruses, interviews with anti-virus experts, and evaluations of current anti-malware products.

Books on computer security 
 The Art of Deception
 The Art of Intrusion
 Crypto: How the Code Rebels Beat the Government—Saving Privacy in the Digital Age
 The Cuckoo's Egg: Tracking a Spy Through the Maze of Computer Espionage – 1989 book written by Clifford Stoll. First person account of the hunt for a hacker who broke into a computer at the Lawrence Berkeley National Laboratory.
 Cypherpunks
 Firewalls and Internet Security
 The Hacker Crackdown
 The Hacker's Handbook
 Hacking: The Art of Exploitation
 Out of the Inner Circle
 Underground

Books on cryptography 

 Books on cryptography

Cyber security community

Cyber security communities 

 UK cyber security community –

Computer security organizations

Academic 

 CERIAS – a center for research and education of information security for computing and communication infrastructures located at Purdue University.
 CERT Coordination Center – A program of Carnegie-Mellon University that develops advanced methods and technologies to counter large-scale, sophisticated cyber threats in partnership with other academic programs and with government and law enforcement agencies. The Cert Knowledgebase compiles information on information security incidents.
 Georgia Tech Information Security Center – department of Georgia Tech that deals with information security issues such as cryptography, network security, trusted computing, software reliability, privacy, and internet governance.
 Oulu University Secure Programming Group – studies, evaluates and develops methods of implementing and testing application and system software in order to prevent, discover and eliminate implementation level security vulnerabilities in a pro-active fashion. The focus is on implementation level security issues and software security testing.

Commercial 

 Australian Information Security Association – also known as AISA with paid members in branches located throughout Australia to monitor the condition of information security.
 Microsoft Digital Crimes Unit – a Microsoft sponsored team of international legal and technical experts to stop or interfere with cyber crime and cyber threats.

Government agencies 

 ARNES – Academic and Research Network of Slovenia, which is responsible for development, operation and management of the communication and information network for education and research. It includes the SI-CERT, the Slovenian Computer Emergency Response Team.
 Canadian Cyber Incident Response Centre – also known as CCIRC, a Canadian government program under the Ministry of Public Safety. The program monitors threats, coordinates national responses, and protects national critical infrastructure against cyber incidents.
 Norwegian Cyber Defence Force – the branch of the Norwegian Armed Forces responsible for military communications and offensive and defensive cyberwarfare in Norway.

Law enforcement agencies 

Internet police – police and secret police departments and other law enforcement agencies in charge of policing the Internet. The major purposes of Internet police, depending on the state, are fighting cybercrime, as well as censorship, propaganda, and monitoring and manipulating the online public opinion.
 Air Force Cyber Command (Provisional) – a proposed U.S. Air Force command that existed in provisional status. On 6 October 2008, the Air Force's cyberspace mission was transferred to USCYBERCOM.
 Department of Defense Cyber Crime Center – also known as DC3, is a United States Department of Defense agency that provides digital forensics support to the DoD and to other law enforcement agencies. DC3's main focus is in criminal, counterintelligence, counterterrorism, and fraud investigations.
 FBI Criminal, Cyber, Response, and Services Branch – also known as CCRSB, is a service within the Federal Bureau of Investigation responsible for investigating certain crimes including all computer-based crime related to counterterrorism, counterintelligence, and criminal threats against the United States.
 FBI Cyber Division – Federal Bureau of Investigation division that heads the national effort to investigate and prosecute internet crimes, including "cyber based terrorism, espionage, computer intrusions, and major cyber fraud." This division of the FBI uses the information it gathers during investigation to inform the public of current trends in cyber crime. It focuses around three main priorities: computer intrusion, identity theft, and cyber fraud.  It was created in 2002.
 National Security Agency – The United States Bureau responsible for national cybersecurity and military communications protection. 
 US-CERT – also known as the United States Computer Emergency Readiness Team, organization within the Department of Homeland Security's (DHS) National Protection and Programs Directorate (NPPD); a branch of the Office of Cybersecurity and Communications' (CS&C) National Cybersecurity and Communications Integration Center (NCCIC). US-CERT is responsible for analyzing and reducing cyber threats, vulnerabilities, disseminating cyber threat warning information, and coordinating incident response activities.
 USCYBERCOM – is an armed forces sub-unified command subordinate to United States Strategic Command. The unit centralizes command of cyberspace operations, organizes existing cyber resources and synchronizes defense of U.S. military networks.

Independent non-profits 
 Australian Information Security Association – organisation for individuals rather than companies that aims to maintain an unbiased view of information security in Australia. Hosts 2 conferences annually.
 Information Card Foundation –  created by Equifax, Google, Microsoft, Novell, Oracle Corporation, PayPal and others, to promote the Information Card approach. Information Cards are personal digital identities that people can use online, and the key component of Identity metasystems.
 Information Systems Security Association – 
 International Computer Security Association – 
 Internet Watch Foundation –
 OWASP –

Independent web-sites 

 Attrition – information security-related website, updated at least weekly by an all-volunteer staff. The "Errata" section is devoted to pointing out inaccuracies, omissions, and other problems with mainstream media related to computer security and hacking. Additionally, staff members publish opinion pieces such as "Security Rants" pointing out problems with the computer security industry.
 Wiretapped.net –

Persons influential in computer security 
 John McAfee – founded McAfee Associates (later called McAfee, Inc.; Intel Security) in 1987, resigned from the company in 1994. At the DEF CON conference in Las Vegas, Nevada in August 2014, he warned Americans not to use smartphones, suggesting apps are used to spy on clueless consumers who do not read privacy user agreements.
 Phil Zimmermann – creator of Pretty Good Privacy (PGP), the most widely used email encryption software in the world.  He is also known for his work in VoIP encryption protocols, notably ZRTP and Zfone. He was a principal designer of the cryptographic key agreement protocol (the "association model") for the Wireless USB standard.
 Ross J. Anderson
 Annie Anton
 Adam Back
 Daniel J. Bernstein
 Stefan Brands
 L. Jean Camp
 Lorrie Cranor
 Cynthia Dwork -- Microsoft Research cryptographer. Among other achievements, responsible for the technology behind bitcoin.
 Deborah Estrin
 Joan Feigenbaum
 Ian Goldberg
 Shafi Goldwasser
 Lawrence A. Gordon
 Peter Gutmann
 Paul Kocher
 Monica S. Lam -- Stanford University computer science professor, director of its MobiSocial Computing Laboratory, involved in Programmable Open Mobile Internet 2020 of the National Science Foundation.
 Brian LaMacchia
 Kevin Mitnick
 Bruce Schneier
 Dawn Song
 Gene Spafford
 Moti Yung—Israeli cryptographer currently at Google research.

See also 

Rubber-hose cryptanalysis

References

External links 

 The Layered Defense approach to Security Malay Upadhyay (Cyberoam), January 2014
 
 Trends in Cyber Security Dan Geer (author), November 2013
 Participating With Safety, a guide to electronic security threats from the viewpoint of civil liberties organisations. Licensed under the GNU Free Documentation License.
 Article "Why Information Security is Hard — An Economic Perspective" by Ross Anderson
 The Information Security Glossary
 The SANS Top 20 Internet Critical Security Controls
 Amit Singh: A Taste of Computer Security 2004
No slowdown in sight for cyber attacks 26.July.2012 USA Today
 Cyber Security Dictionary
 Cybersecurity: Authoritative Reports and Resources, by Topic Congressional Research Service

 Windows 7 security
 The ultimate guide to Windows 7 security

 Windows 8 security

 Mac security

 Linux security
 Security In-Depth for Linux Software: Preventing and Mitigating Security Bugs (PDF)

 Threat alerts and vulnerability tracking lists
 Lists of advisories by product Lists of known unpatched vulnerabilities from Secunia
 Vulnerabilities from SecurityFocus, including the Bugtraq mailing list.
 List of vulnerabilities maintained by the government of the USA

 
Computer security
Computer security